John Douglas ( – ) was a member of the General Court of the Colony of Connecticut from Norwalk in the October 1669 session.

References 

Date of death unknown
17th-century births
Members of the Connecticut General Assembly
Politicians from Norwalk, Connecticut
Place of birth unknown